Kizilkilise, Kızıl Kilise (Turkish 'red church'), in Armenian Kizilkilisa, may refer to:

In Armenia
 Artsni, formerly Kizilkilisa
 Karmravan, formerly Kizilkilisa Armyanskaya

In Turkey

 Nazimiye, formerly Kızılkilise, a town in Tunceli province
 Kizil Kilise, a 7th-century church in Cappadocia
 A 13th-century church in the village of Bayraktar, Bayburt